Ksar Akil (also Ksar 'Akil or Ksar Aqil) is an archeological site  northeast of Beirut in Lebanon. It is a large rock shelter below a steep limestone cliff.

It was first noticed by Godefroy Zumoffen in 1900 and first studied by A. E. Day in 1926 then first systematically excavated by J.G. Doherty, S.J., and J.F. Ewing, S.J., in 1937-1938 and again in 1947-1948, then later by Jacques Tixier in 1969-1975 before research was interrupted by the Lebanese Civil War.

The first level of  contained Upper Levallois-Mousterian remains with long and triangular Lithic flakes. The level above this showed industries accounting for all six stages of the Upper Paleolithic. Studies by Hooijer showed Capra and Dama were dominant in the fauna along with Stephanorhinus in later Levalloiso-Mousterian levels.

It is assumed to be one of the earliest known sites containing Upper Paleolithic technologies including Ahmarian cultural objects. Artifacts recovered from the site include Ksar Akil flakes, the main type of tool found at the site, along with pierced shells and chipped edge modifications that suggest these have been used as pendants or beads. This indicates that the inhabitants were among the first in Western Eurasia to use personal ornaments. Results from radiocarbon dating indicate that the early humans may have lived at the site approximately 45,000 years ago or earlier. The presence of  personal ornaments at Ksar Akil is suggestive of modern human behavior. The findings of ornaments at the site are contemporaneous with ornaments found at Late Stone Age sites such as Enkapune Ya Muto.

The site was rescued from burial under the sludge of gravel-making machines in 1964 by the Department of Antiquities, although is mostly unrecognizable due to quarrying operations with its talus buried under tons of soil.

Aside from 10 teeth from Üçağızlı Cave in southern Turkey, Ksar Akil is the only site with hominin remains from the Early Upper Paleolithic and Initial Upper Paleolithic in the Levant discovered so far.

Hominin remains

Ksar Akil 1: "Egbert" 
A complete skeleton of a juvenile Homo sapiens, referred to as Ksar Akil 1, or more commonly known as Egbert, was discovered in level XVII at  cemented into breccia. At the time of death, Egbert is estimated to have been 7 to 9 years old, and due to its small size, may have been female. Egbert was covered by a pile of cobbles, which may indicate deliberate burial. A second maxilla and some rib fragments were discovered nearby the burial, which indicates a second individual may also have been buried in the same place.  

Egbert is known only from descriptions, photographs, and reconstructed casts of the skull, now in the National Museum of Beirut, after being studied in America. Ewing gave Egbert's skull to the National Museum of Beirut, and it's unknown what he did with the rest of the skeleton, but both parts became subsequently lost.

Radiocarbon dating and Bayesian modelling supports an age range of 40,800 to 39,200 years BP for Egbert.

Ksar Akil 2: "Ethelruda" 
The layer that Ksar Akil 2 was found in is the start of the Initial Upper Paleolithic in the Levant. An Emireh point was also found in this level. 

Ethelruda was thought to be lost for many years, but was relocated in storage at the National Museum of Beirut.

The maxilla was originally described as a "Neanderthaloid" adult female on the basis of its similarity to fossils from Tabun I, Skhul IV and V, Gibraltar and La Chapelle-aux-Saints 1. However, these similarities have since been questioned. For instance, due to its small size and tooth sockets, Ksar Akil 2 has been described as similar to the maxilla Skhul V, which was originally thought to be a Neanderthal, but is now considered to be an archaic Homo sapiens. On the other hand, the nasal floor is depressed, and the specimen lacks a canine fossa, both of which are features of Neanderthals. The original illustrations of this material have proved insufficient to prove for certain whether Ethelruda is Homo sapiens or Neanderthal or a hybrid. 

Radiocarbon dating and Bayesian modelling supports an age range of 42.4–41.7 ka BP for Ethelruda.

References

Further reading
 Braidwood, R., Wright, H. E., and Ewing, J.F., Ksar Akil, its Archaeological Sequence and Geological Setting., Journal of Near-Eastern Studies, Volume 10, 1951.
 Ewing, J., Preliminary Note on the Excavations at the Paleolithic Site of Ksar Akil, Republic of Lebanon, Antiquity, vol. 21, p. 186, 1947.
 Ewing, J., Human types and Prehistoric Cultures at Ksar Akil, Lebanon, Selected papers, 5th C.I.S.A.E., Philadelphia, University of Pennsylvania Press, 1956.
 Ewing, J., A Probably Neanderthaloid from Ksar Akil, Lebanon. American Journal of Physical Anthropology, Volume 21, Number 2, 1963.
 Howell, F., Upper Pleistocene Stratigraphy and Early Man in the Levant, Proceedings of the American Philosophical Society, Volume 103, 1959.
 Garrod, D., A Transitional Industry from the Base of the Upper Paleolithic in Palestine and Syria. Journal of the Royal Anthropological Institute, Volume 81, 1952.
 Garrod, D., The Relations between Southwest Asia and Europe in the Later Paleolithic Age, Journal of World History, Volume 1, 1953.
 Wright, H.E., Late Pleistocene Geology of Coastal Lebanon, 3rd Symposium, Wenner-Grenn Foundation for Anthropological Research on "Early man and Pleistocene Stratigraphy in Circum-Mediterranean Regions", 1960.
 Wright, H.E., Late Pleistocene Geology of Coastal Lebanon, Quaternaria, Volume 6, 1962.
 Hooijer, D. A., The Fossil Vertebrates of Ksar Akil, a Paleolithic Rock-Shelter in the Lebanon, Zoloögische Verhandelgingen, 49, 1, 1961.
 Field, H., Ancient and Modern Man in Southwestern Asia, Volume I, University of Miami Press, 1956.

Monographs 
 Bergman, C.A. 1987.  Ksar Akil, Lebanon:  A Technological and Typological Analysis of the Later Palaeolithic Levels.  Volume II.  BAR International Series 329.
 Bergman, C.A. and L. Copeland (eds.) 1986.  I. Azoury Ksar Akil, Lebanon:  A Technological and Typological Analysis of the Transitional and Early Upper Palaeolithic Levels of Ksar Akil and Abu Halka.  Volume I.  BAR International Series 289 (i and ii).
 Leder, D.  2014. Technological and Typological change at the Middle to Upper Plaeolithic boundary in Lebanon. Universitätsforschungen zur Prähistorischen Archäologie. Habelt Verlag.

Articles 
 Bergman, C.A.  2004.  Twisted Debitage and the Levantine Aurignacian Problem.  in A. Belfer-Cohen and A.N. Goring-Morris (eds.)  More than Meets the Eye: Studies on Upper Palaeolithic Diversity in the Near East.  Oxbow Press, Oxford: 185-195.
 Ohnuma, K. and C.A. Bergman 1990.  A technological study of the Upper Palaeolithic levels XXV-VI from Ksar Akil, Lebanon.  in P. Mellars and C. Stringer (eds.) The Origins and Dispersal of Modern Man.  Cambridge University Press: 91-138.
 Bergman, C.A. and C.B. Stringer 1989.  Fifty years after: Egbert, an Upper Palaeolithic Juvenile from Ksar Akil, Lebanon.  Paléorient 15/2: 99-111.
 Bergman, C.A. 1988. Ksar Akil and the Upper Palaeolithic of the Levant.  "Préhistoire du Levant 2"  Paléorient 14/2: 201-210.
 Bergman, C.A. and N. Goring-Morris 1987.  Conference:  The Levantine Aurignacian with special reference to Ksar Akil, Lebanon.  Paléorient 13/1: 142-145.
 Bergman, C.A.  1987.  Hafting and use of bone and antler points from Ksar Akil, Lebanon.  in D. Stordeur (ed.)  La Main et l'Outil.  Travaux  de la Maison de l’Orient Méditerranéen, Lyon 15:  117-126.
 Bergman, C.A. and K. Ohnuma 1987.  The Upper Palaeolithic Sequence of Ksar Akil, Lebanon.  Berytus XXV: 13-40.
 Leder, D.  2016. Core reduction strategies at the Initial Upper Palaeolithic sites Ksar Akil and Abou Halka in Lebanon. 'Lithics: the Journal of the Lithic Studies Society' 37: 33–53.

External links 
 University of Cologne, Radio-carbon context database entry for Ksar Akil

Archaeological sites in Lebanon
Upper Paleolithic sites
Paleolithic Asia
Neanderthal sites
Rock shelters